Mahasathi Anasuya is a 1965 Indian Kannada-language film, directed and produced by B. S. Ranga. The film stars Rajkumar, Pandari Bai, Leelavathi, Jayanthi and Vanisri. The film has musical score by S. Hanumantha Rao. Rajkumar portrayed the role of god-sage Narada in the movie.

Cast

Soundtrack
The music was composed by Hanumantha Rao.

References

External links
 

1960s Kannada-language films
Hindu mythological films